Aitken may refer to:

 Aitken (crater), crater on the Moon
 South Pole–Aitken basin, impact crater on the far side of the Moon
 Aitken's delta-squared process, mathematical method
 Aitken (surname), people with the surname Aitken

See also
 Aitkin (disambiguation)
 Adkins